Linn Laupsa (born 13 August 1977) is a Norwegian politician for the Socialist Left Party.

She served as a deputy representative to the Norwegian Parliament from Østfold during the terms 2001–2005 and 2005–2009.

He has been a member of Halden municipal council.

References

1977 births
Living people
Deputy members of the Storting
Socialist Left Party (Norway) politicians
Østfold politicians
People from Halden
Place of birth missing (living people)
21st-century Norwegian women politicians
21st-century Norwegian politicians
Women members of the Storting